Hersilia Cove is the 650 m wide cove indenting for 800 m the north coast of Rugged Island in the South Shetland Islands, Antarctica west of Herring Point.

Location

History
The cove was named in February 1820 by Captain James Sheffield, Master of the brig , the first American sealer known to have visited the South Shetlands. It was the starting point of Antarctic sealing south of 60° south latitude, when the ship Espirito Santo with English crew under Captain Joseph Herring and chartered in Buenos Aires arrived to the cove on Christmas Day of 1819.

Maps
 Península Byers, Isla Livingston. Mapa topográfico a escala 1:25000. Madrid: Servicio Geográfico del Ejército, 1992.

 L.L. Ivanov. Antarctica: Livingston Island and Greenwich, Robert, Snow and Smith Islands. Scale 1:120000 topographic map. Troyan: Manfred Wörner Foundation, 2009.

References
Hersilia Cove. SCAR Composite Antarctic Gazetteer

Coves of the South Shetland Islands